Mohamed Mohamed (born 7 February 2001) is a Bahraini handball player for the Barbar Club and Bahrain. He competed in the 2020 Summer Olympics.

References

2001 births
Living people
Bahraini male handball players
Olympic handball players of Bahrain
Handball players at the 2020 Summer Olympics
21st-century Bahraini people